The Stawamus River  is a small, creek-like river in British Columbia.  It enters the Howe Sound east of the mouth of the Squamish River.

Course 
The Stawamus River begins at the outlet of Stawamus Lake.  It flows north for about  before turning northwest for about  until it enters the District of Squamish.  After emerging from the mountains and entering Squamish, it turns west for about  until it reaches its mouth in the Squamish River.  The Stawamus has no major tributaries.

See also
Stawamus Chief
Slhanay
List of British Columbia rivers

References 

Rivers of British Columbia
North Shore Mountains
New Westminster Land District